Haixing County is a county of southeastern Hebei province, China, bordering Shandong to the southeast. Both G18 Rongcheng–Wuhai Expressway and G25 Changchun–Shenzhen Expressway pass through the county.

Administrative divisions
The county administers 3 towns and 4 townships.

Towns:
Suji, Xinji, Gaowan

Townships:
Zhaomaotao Township, Xiangfang Township, Xiaoshan Township, Zhanghuiting Township

Climate

References

County-level divisions of Hebei
Cangzhou